Vexillum (Costellaria) takakuwai is a species of small sea snail, marine gastropod mollusk in the family Costellariidae, the ribbed miters.

Description
The shell size varies between 27 mm and 70 mm

Distribution
This species occurs in the Pacific Ocean off Japan and Queensland, Australia.

References

 Turner H. 2001. Katalog der Familie Costellariidae Macdonald, 1860. Conchbooks. 1–100-page(s): 63

External links
 

takakuwai
Gastropods described in 1974